1964–65 Kuwaiti Premier League was the 4th season of the First League Division.

Overview
In the fourth season, the school teams, which are Thanwit Al-Shoike, Al-Kalia Al-Saneia and Al-Shorta, were excluded from participating in the league and witnessed the participation of three new clubs, namely Al-Salmiya, Al-Fahaheel and Al-Shabab. Kuwait SC managed to end Al-Arabi's monopoly on the league championship to achieve its first title in its history after topping the league table without any defeat with eighteen points, scoring 44 goals and conceding 9 goals.

League table

References
RSSSF

Kuwait Premier League seasons
Kuwait
football